Wirberg is a former monastery complex in the district of Giessen. It is located on the eastern edge of the municipality of Reiskirchen between Saasen  and Göbelnrod, and about eight miles north-west of Grünberg. The church was once the Protestant Church serving the Grünberg districts of Göbelnrod, Beltershain, Harbach, Weitershain and Reinhardshain. Today, it is used as a church on special occasions.

History 

The name "Wirberg" comes from Wereberch, meaning "fortified hill". There was a fortified castle there at the beginning of the 12th century.

The Premonstratensian monastery was founded as a double monastery between 1134 and 1148 by  the Premonstratensian Otto von Cappenberg, who was provost of the Cappenberg monastery until his death in 1171. Cappenberg was founded as a double monastery. His brother, Godfrey of Cappenberg, had already founded Ilbenstadt Monastery.

The female founder was Aurelia, the daughter of Manegold von Wirberg, who brought her inheritance with her as a dowry.
The patron saints of the monastery were the Virgin Mary and St. Martin. Toward the end of the 13th century, the double monastery became just a nunnery, and in 1286 the sisters switched to the Order of Augustinian Canonesses.

During the Reformation in Hesse, the monastery was dissolved in 1527 and its assets were transferred to the University of Marburg. 
During the  Thirty Years' War, in 1635, the rectory was destroyed and the church was damaged. After the end of the war, in 1658, it was rebuilt, and in 1690 a new rectory was built. 
In 1716, the tower of the church collapsed and destroyed the nave.
The present church was built on the site of the ruins in 1753-1754 and consecrated in 1755. It is still used for weddings and baptisms, and the restored buildings are now used as a recreation centre for youth groups of the Protestant Church in Hesse and Nassau
In the summer, the meadows in front of the monastery are used as a camp site for youth groups, boy scouts and girl guides.

Protestant pastors at Wirberg

16th century 
 Johannes Wagner, 1527 to c. 1531
 Emmericus, 1535
 Sebastian Heckersdorf c. 1550 to 1569
 Konrad Corvinus, 1569 to 1574
 Johannes Armbroster, 1574 to 1589
 Heinrich Ruppersberg, 1589 to 1619

17th century 
 Johannes Wetzelius, 1619 to 1635
 Johannes Staudinger, 1635
 Johannes Braun, 1635 to c. 1677
 Kaspar Reitz, 1651 to 1712 first assistant, then pastor

18th century 
 Johann Philipp Eckhard, 1712 to 1715
 Johannes Heß, 1715 to 1727
 Martin Baldasar Fischer, 1727 to 1742
 Johannes Jeremias Nebel, 1742 to 1771
 Jakob Heinrich Wilhelm Stipp, 1772 to 1784
 Johann Daniel Bernbeck, 1784 to 1816

19th century 
 Ernst Friedrich Steinberger, 1816 to 1832
 Johann Wilhelm Röhrig, 1835 to 1850
 Friedrich August Herzberger, 1850 to 1855
 Hermann Hüffel, 1856 to 1875
 Georg Sehrt, 1877 to 1887
 Peter Ahlheim, 1891 to 1896
 Gustav Biedenkopf, 1897 to 1905

20th century 
 Ernst Siebeck, 1906 to 1910 
 Heinrich Blank, 1911 to 1921 
 Otto Wilhelm Döll, 1921 to 1933
 Friedrich Wilhelm Christian Volz, 1933 to 1946
 Heinrich Wilhelm Schäfer, 1946 to 1952 
 Ruprecht Erich Helmut Albrecht Spangenberg, 1952 to 1954
 Theo Gustav Weygandt, 1954 to 1960
 Walter Müller, 1960 to 1971
 Karl-Heinz Westenberger, 1971 to 1983
 Rolf Schmidt, seit 1986

Bibliography 
 
 
 
 .

External links 
 
 

Monasteries in Hesse
Christian monasteries established in the 12th century
Premonstratensian monasteries in Germany
Premonstratensian nunneries
Double monasteries